Leandro Adrian Ledesma (born 15 March 1987) is an Argentine football forward, who plays for Unión Aconquija.

ŠK Slovan Bratislava
On 26 September 2012, Ledesma, also known as Coco signed half-year contract with Slovan Bratislava. In December 2012, he did not extend his contract.

External links

References

1987 births
Living people
Footballers from Santa Fe, Argentina
Argentine footballers
Argentine expatriate footballers
Association football forwards
Club Atlético Patronato footballers
Club Atlético Colón footballers
Tiro Federal footballers
ŠK Slovan Bratislava players
San Luis de Quillota footballers
Primera B de Chile players
Slovak Super Liga players
Expatriate footballers in Chile
Expatriate footballers in Slovakia
Argentine expatriate sportspeople in Chile
Argentine expatriate sportspeople in Slovakia